2A self-cleaving peptides, or 2A peptides, is a class of 18–22 aa-long peptides, which can induce ribosomal skipping during translation of a protein in a cell.

The members of 2A peptides are named after the virus in which they have been first described. For example, F2A, the first described 2A peptide, is derived from foot-and-mouth disease virus. The name "2A" itself comes from the gene numbering scheme of this virus.

Members
Four members of 2A peptides family are frequently used in life science research. They are P2A, E2A, F2A, and T2A. F2A is derived from foot-and-mouth disease virus 18; E2A is derived from equine rhinitis A virus; P2A is derived from porcine teschovirus-1 2A; T2A is derived from thosea asigna virus 2A.

The following table shows the sequences of four members of 2A peptides. Adding the optional linker “GSG” (Gly-Ser-Gly) on the N-terminal of a 2A peptide helps with efficiency.

Description
The apparent cleavage is triggered by ribosomal skipping of the peptide bond between the proline (P) and glycine (G) in C-terminal of 2A peptide, resulting in the peptide located upstream of the 2A peptide to have extra amino acids on its C-terminal end while the peptide located downstream the 2A peptide will have an extra proline on its N-terminal end. The exact molecular mechanism of 2A-peptide-mediated cleavage is still unknown. However, it is believed to involve ribosomal "skipping" of glycyl-prolyl peptide bond formation rather than true proteolytic cleavage.

Application
In genetic engineering, the 2A peptides are used to cleave a longer peptide into two shorter peptides. The 2A peptides can be applied when the fused protein doesn’t work. Inserting the CDS of a 2A peptide into the fusing point or replacing the linker sequence with the CDS of a 2A peptide protein can cleave the fused protein into two separated peptides, rescuing the function of the two peptides.

2A peptides, when combined (or not) with the IRES elements, can make it possible to generate multiple separated peptides within a single transcript.

Incomplete cleavage 
Different 2A peptides have different efficiencies of self-cleaving, T2A and P2A being the most and F2A the least efficient. Therefore, up to 50% of F2A-linked proteins can remain in the cell as a fusion protein, which might cause some unpredictable outcomes, including a gain of function. One study reported that 2A sites cause the ribosome to fall off approximately 60% of the time, and that, together with ribosome read-through of about 10% for P2A and T2A, this results in reducing expression of the downstream peptide chain by about 70%. However, the level of drop-off detected in this study varied widely depending on the exact construct used, with some constructs showing little evidence of drop-off; furthermore, within a tri-cistronic transcript it reported a higher level of ribosome drop-off after one 2A sequence than after two 2As combined, which is at odds with a linear model of translation.

See also 
IRES
Recombinant DNA

References 

Genetic engineering
Molecular biology